Liudas Vaineikis (1869, Svirpliai, Kovno Governorate – 1938) was a physician and notable member of the Knygnešiai book smuggling movement during the Lithuanian press ban (1864–1904), when the printing and distribution of Lithuanian language materials using the Latin alphabet was illegal in the Russian-controlled parts of the region.

Vaineikis,  born in Šiauliai County, enrolled in the University of Moscow medical school in 1889. He was arrested in connection with the press ban in 1896 and expelled, but succeeded in passing a qualifying examination the same year. He began practicing medicine in the city of Palanga, while organizing resistance to the ban and maintaining connections with socialists and revolutionaries who opposed the rule of the Russian Empire. In 1899, he managed to obtain government permit for America in the Bathhouse (Amerika pirtyje), the first Lithuanian-language theater performance in present-day Lithuania. These activities led to his arrest in 1900; he spent two years at a prison in Liepāja, Latvia and was then exiled to the Siberian city of  Yakutsk in 1902. His wife voluntarily accompanied him. After his release in 1905, he worked with the Lithuanian Social Democratic Party as an editor and organizer. He worked as a doctor in Central Asia between 1915 and 1920, returning to Palanga in 1921 and serving as the city's official physician after 1928.

Footnotes

References
  Liudas Vaineikis. The Lithuanian Word, reprinted from Encyclopedia Lituanica, Boston 1970–1978.

1869 births
1938 deaths
Lithuanian book smugglers
Lithuanian physicians
People from Joniškis District Municipality
People from Kovno Governorate
Internal exiles from the Russian Empire
Physicians from the Russian Empire